The Flight Attendant is an American dark comedy drama mystery thriller television series developed by Steve Yockey based on the 2018 novel of the same name by Chris Bohjalian. It stars Kaley Cuoco in the title role and premiered on HBO Max on November 26, 2020. In December 2020, the series was renewed for a second season, which premiered on April 21, 2022.

Plot
American flight attendant Cassie Bowden is a reckless alcoholic who drinks during flights and spends her time having sex with strangers, including her passengers. When she wakes up in a hotel room in Bangkok with a hangover from the night before, she discovers the dead body of a passenger on her last flight lying next to her with his throat slashed. Afraid to call the police, she cleans up the crime scene, then joins the other airline crew traveling to the airport. In New York City, she is met by Federal Bureau of Investigation (FBI) agents who question her about the layover in Bangkok. Still unable to piece the night together, and suffering intermittent flashbacks/hallucinations about it, she begins to wonder who the killer could be.

Season 2 takes place a year after the events of the previous season. Cassie now works part-time as an asset for the CIA, where she surveils people in between flights. She has been sober for a year, is a regular member of Alcoholics Anonymous, and has relocated to Los Angeles, where she has a new boyfriend, Marco. During an assignment in Berlin, her target is assassinated by a woman pretending to be her, down to the tattoo. She is haunted by the images of her doppelgänger and tries to figure out who is impersonating her, while suffering hallucinations once again, this time of the past versions of herself who try to persuade her to revert to who she once was. It is later revealed that Cassie's year of sobriety is a sham and that she had relapsed at least twice within that period, but suppressed the memory of doing so.

Cast and characters

Main

 Kaley Cuoco as Cassandra "Cassie" Bowden: An alcoholic flight attendant with self-destructive tendencies. She has a one night stand with a passenger in Bangkok and wakes up to his dead body the next morning. She is left to search for answers to clear her name of the murder. Audrey Grace Marshall portrays young Cassie. 
 Michiel Huisman as Alex Sokolov (season 1): A businessman on Cassie's flight to Bangkok. He is murdered in the first episode and primarily appears through hallucinations and flashbacks.
 Zosia Mamet as Annie Mouradian: A lawyer and Cassie's best friend who assists her with her situation.
 T. R. Knight as Davey Bowden (season 1; recurring season 2): Cassie's older brother, with whom she has a complicated relationship. Owen Asztalos portrays young Davey in season 1.
 Michelle Gomez as Miranda Croft (season 1; guest season 2): A mysterious woman with connections to Alex. 
 Colin Woodell as Buckley Ware, also known as Feliks (season 1; guest season 2): Cassie's romantic interest who she meets on a bender.
 Merle Dandridge as Kim Hammond (season 1): The lead FBI agent investigating Alex's murder and Agent White's partner.
 Griffin Matthews as Shane Evans: A flight attendant and a friend of Cassie's.
 Nolan Gerard Funk as Van White (season 1): An FBI agent who suspects Cassie of the murder and Agent Hammond's partner.
 Rosie Perez as Megan Briscoe: The team flight lead and Cassie's friend, who has secrets of her own.
 Deniz Akdeniz as Max Park (season 2; recurring season 1): Annie's boyfriend and a hacker who helps Cassie.
 Mo McRae as Benjamin Berry (season 2): A CIA agent who serves as Cassie's handler.  
 Callie Hernandez as Gabrielle Diaz (season 2): Esteban's wife and a passenger on Cassie's flight to Berlin.
 J.J. Soria as Esteban Diaz (season 2): Gabrielle's husband and a passenger on Cassie's flight to Berlin.
 Cheryl Hines as Dot Karlson (season 2): Benjamin's boss in the CIA.

Recurring
 Audrey Grace Marshall as Young Cassie
 Terry Serpico as Bill Briscoe
 Jason Jones as Hank Bowden (season 1)
 Alberto Frezza as Enrico (season 1)
 Bebe Neuwirth as Diana Carlisle (season 1) 
 Yasha Jackson as Jada Harris
 Isha Blaaker as Nate (season 1)
 Stephanie Koenig as Sabrina Oznowich (season 1)
 Ritchie Coster as Victor (season 1)
 Ann Magnuson as Janet Sokolov (season 1)
 Bruce Baek as Hak Oh-Seong 
 Briana Cuoco as Cecilia
 David Iacono as Eli Briscoe
 Mae Martin as Grace St. James (season 2)
 Jessie Ennis as Jenny (season 2)
 Santiago Cabrera as Marco (season 2)
 Shohreh Aghdashloo as Brenda (season 2)
 Erik Passoja as Jim Jones (season 2)
 Margaret Cho as Charlie Utada (season 2)
 Alanna Ubach as Carol Atkinson (season 2)
 Sharon Stone as Lisa Bowden (season 2)
 Izabella Miko as Cherri (season 2)

Episodes

Season 1 (2020)

Season 2 (2022)

Production

Development
On October 27, 2017, it was announced that Kaley Cuoco's production company, Yes, Norman Productions, had optioned the rights to the novel, The Flight Attendant. The novel would be developed into what was reported to be a limited television series with Cuoco as executive producer. On July 1, 2019, it was announced that Greg Berlanti had joined the series as an executive producer through Berlanti Productions. On July 1, 2019, it was announced that the series would join WarnerMedia's new streaming service, HBO Max. On December 18, 2020, HBO Max renewed the series for a second season.

Casting
Upon the series development announcement, Cuoco was also cast to star in the series. In September 2019, Sonoya Mizuno was cast to star alongside Cuoco. In October, Michiel Huisman, Colin Woodell, Rosie Perez, and Zosia Mamet joined the cast of the series. In November 2019, Merle Dandridge, Griffin Matthews, and T. R. Knight joined the cast of the series. In December 2019, Nolan Gerard Funk joined the cast. Bebe Neuwirth was added in a recurring role in February 2020. In August 2020, Michelle Gomez joined the cast of the series, replacing Mizuno. In October 2020, Yasha Jackson joined the cast in a recurring role. In September 2021, Mo McRae, Callie Hernandez, and JJ Soria were cast as new series regulars while Cheryl Hines, Jessie Ennis, Mae Martin, Margaret Cho, Santiago Cabrera, and Shohreh Aghdashloo were cast in recurring capacities. In November 2021, Alanna Ubach joined the cast in a recurring role for the second season. In January 2022, Sharon Stone was cast in a recurring role for the second season.

Filming
Filming began in November 2019 in Bangkok, Thailand, before continuing in White Plains, New York, in December. On March 12, 2020, Warner Bros. Television shut down production on the series due to the COVID-19 pandemic. Production on the season's remaining two episodes resumed on August 31, 2020, in New York. For the second season, the series relocated its production to California to take advantage of tax incentives provided by the California Film Commission. Cuoco stated that the producers consulted with the team who worked on Orphan Black to film the scenes which involved multiple versions of Cassie and explained that those scenes were shot on a massive sound stage with several body doubles that she would act opposite.

Soundtrack
Sia's "Angel by the Wings" was featured on the season 1 finale ("Arrivals and Departures").

Cassie's ringtone is a sample of "Two of Hearts" by Stacey Q.

Release
The series premiered on November 26, 2020, with the first three episodes available. On October 20, 2020, an official trailer for the series and the rollout plan of episodes after the premiere were released; two episodes released on December 3, followed by two more episodes on December 10, and then the season finale on December 17. The second season premiered on April 21, 2022, with the first two episodes available immediately, followed by two more episodes on April 28, and one episode debuting on a weekly basis until the season finale on May 26.

The first season began airing on TBS in March 2022.

In the United Kingdom, the first and second seasons were released by Sky, and aired on their own channel Sky Max. Also shown on Sky Showcase, as HBO Max is currently unavailable in the UK.

Home media
The first and second seasons were released on DVD, on November 29, 2022. A Blu-ray and 4K Ultra HD Blu-ray are not yet announced.

Reception

Critical response

Season 1 
The first season received mostly positive reviews. On the review aggregator Rotten Tomatoes, it holds a 97% approval rating with an average rating of 7.4/10, based on 69 reviews. The website's critics consensus reads, "Kaley Cuoco shines as a hot mess in The Flight Attendant, an addictively intriguing slice of stylish pulp that will bring mystery aficionados to Cloud Nine." According to Metacritic, which calculated a weighted average score of 78 out of 100 based on 24 critic reviews, the series received "generally favorable reviews".

Reviewing the series for Rolling Stone, Alan Sepinwall gave it 3.5 out of 5 stars and said, "Cuoco is sharp and likable throughout, two necessary ingredients for playing a character who makes a scene wherever she goes."

Season 2 
The second season also received mostly positive reviews. On Rotten Tomatoes, it has a 86% approval rating with an average rating of 7.15/10, based on 53 reviews. The website's critics consensus states, "While there's some turbulence as The Flight Attendant charters a new course, passengers are in safe hands with Kaley Cuoco's zestful turn and the writers' knack for satisfying twists." On Metacritic, the second season has a weighted average score of 76 out of 100 based on 21 critic reviews, indicating "generally favorable reviews".

Awards and nominations

Audience viewership 
According to TVLine, The Flight Attendant became the HBO Max's biggest debut of all time, until it was surpassed by Gossip Girl reboot in 2021. According to HBO Max, the first season "saw week over week growth and ranked as HBO Max’s No. 1 series overall during its run."

Notes

References

External links
 
 
 
 

2020 American television series debuts
2020s American comedy-drama television series
2020s American mystery television series
Alcohol abuse in television
American thriller television series
Aviation television series
English-language television shows
HBO Max original programming
Murder in television
Television productions suspended due to the COVID-19 pandemic
Television series about the Central Intelligence Agency
Television series by Warner Bros. Television Studios
Television series by Yes, Norman Productions
Television shows based on American novels
Television shows filmed in Los Angeles
Television shows filmed in New York City
Television shows filmed in Thailand
Television shows set in Bangkok
Television shows set in Los Angeles
Television shows set in New York City
Television series about flight attendants